Gumley Cricket Club is an amateur cricket club based in Gumley, Leicestershire, England. The club has three senior teams. The Saturday XI, having traditionally played friendlies, started playing competitive cricket in 2009, in the Northamptonshire Cricket League. A Sunday XI side plays friendly fixtures against an established selection of clubs in and around the region. A Midweek XI compete in the Market Harborough District Midweek Evening League and Knockout competitions.

Gumley Top
Gumley is a small village in South East Leicestershire, 4 miles north west of Market Harborough. Gumley cricket field is situated in the middle of the scheduled remains of the Gumley medieval settlement on the North West edge of the village, on a picturesque position along the gated road to Laughton. The field has extensive views of the valley looking South from the pavilion, and is characterised by the road which bisects a small portion of the outfield between the square and the pavilion. Motorists are relatively few on this particular stretch, but those that do arrive during a game are politely asked by way of a sign to wait until the end of the over.

History
There's a long history of cricket in Gumley, with reference to matches as early as the mid 19th century. One account, reported in the Leicester Chronicle in 1873 recorded a match between Kibworth and Gumley regressing into a brawl between the two teams, fueled in part by the presence of alcohol. However, facilities and decorum have improved markedly over the years. A concerted effort by several club members have raised the quality of the square and fund raising efforts have yielded many improvements to the pavilion, in particular a much needed new roof.

Touring
The club arranges an annual tour of 4 matches on consecutive days from the Thursday after the late May Bank Holiday. Past venues include: Margate, Braintree, Barnstaple, Havant, Harrogate, etc. The tour has been a regular feature of the club calendar since 2000.

Club Performance
The Leicestershire & Rutland Cricket League competition results showing the club's position (by Division) since 2017.
 

 

 

The Northamptonshire Cricket League competition results showing the club's position (by Division) since 2008.

Club Honours

Club Captains
The club appoints a separate Captain for each of its three teams. Captain since 1977 are as follows:

Saturday XI
David Holyland 1977-1985
David Bromley 1985-1996
Simon Cohen 1996-2002
Matt Wilson 2002-2007
Ben Wilson 2007-2008
Joe Hallam 2009–present

Sunday XI
David Holyland 1977-1985
David Bromley 1985-1996
Ken Woolnough 1996-2002
Simon Cohen 2002-2004
Joly Pickering 2007-2008
Richard Davies 2009–present

Midweek XI
Simon Cohen 1994-2000
Chris Sleath 2000-2001
Joly Pickering 2001-2003
David Krause 2003-2003
Anthony Masic 2003-2004
Joly Pickering 2004-2008
Steven Masic 2009–present

Club Officials
Since 1977 are as follows:

Secretary
John Bundey 1977-1983
Adam Burdett 1993-1996
David Bromley 1996-2004
Dennis Pickering 2004-2009
Toby Pickering 2009–present

Treasurer
David Holyland 1977-1982
Tony Masic 1982-1989
David Bromley 1989-2008
Tony Masic 2004-2008
Ben Hunt 2008-2010
Glynn Marshall 2010–present

Fixture Secretary
Peter Pickering 1977-2007
Steven Masic 2007–present

Annual Awards
Performance prizes awarded at the end of each season since 2000 are as follows:

Best Batsman 
2008 ?
2009 Alan Pickering

Best Bowler
2008 ?
2009 Peter Pickering

Best Fielder
2007 Richard Krause
2008 Glynn Marshall
2009 Dennis Pickering

Best Young Player
2008 Daniel Masic
2009 Luke Masic

Best League Batsman 
2009 Joe Hallam

Best League Bowler
2009 ?

Best Midweek Player
2007 ?
2008 ?

Merit Award
2008 Dennis Pickering
2009 Joe Hallam

Regular Events

The club runs a range of events throughout the year. On the cricket side, the intra-club Twenty20 day has proved very popular. The last game of each season is the keenly fought Club Match. This has traditionally been a Saturday vs Sunday affair, but with the better players gravitating to the League side, a new format was introduced in 2009 of 'Greys' (being over 35) vs 'Kids'. A recent addition to the calendar is Presidents Day. This is seen as an opportunity to say 'thank you' to our benefactors and features the Sunday team taking on a Select XI.

Away from cricket, a variety of social and fund-raising events are held throughout the year, ranging from golf days to millionaires evenings and race nights. The club arranges a fireworks display each Guy Fawkes night, in conjunction with the local Scout troop. This event regularly attracts a very large audience from the surrounding villages.

See also
Club cricket

References

External links
 Gumley Cricket Club - Official website
 The Pickering Papers - Unofficial web log
 Leicestershire & Rutland Cricket Board

English club cricket teams
Cricket in Leicestershire
Club cricket
1977 establishments in England